Jacques Piette (13 May 1916, Issy-les-Moulineaux - 2 April 1990) was a French politician. He represented the French Section of the Workers' International (SFIO) in the National Assembly from 1956 to 1958.

References

1916 births
1990 deaths
People from Issy-les-Moulineaux
Politicians from Île-de-France
French Communist Party politicians
French Section of the Workers' International politicians
Socialist Party (France) politicians
Deputies of the 3rd National Assembly of the French Fourth Republic
French people of the Spanish Civil War
French military personnel of World War II
French Resistance members
Companions of the Liberation
Recipients of the Resistance Medal